The Enterprise Base Ball Club of Brooklyn (also known as the Enterprise of Bedford) was an American baseball club in the 1850s and 1860s.

Founding
The Enterprise was founded as an amateur club on June 28, 1856, in the neighborhood of Bedford, in Brooklyn, New York. At the time, baseball (then spelled as two words — "base ball") was strictly a non-professional sport, played for recreation and exercise. There were no organized leagues, and rules often varied by region.

Shortly after the club was founded, the New York Clipper described the Enterprise Club (as well as the Star Club of South Brooklyn) as “youths ranging from 15 to 18 years of age, who have organized, like thousands of others, for the purpose of perfecting themselves in the various physical exercises, which are so necessary for a development of the mental faculties."

By contemporaneous journalistic accounts, in their first five seasons, the Enterprise were considered an elite "Junior" class squad. "Junior" clubs generally consisted of younger, less experienced, but often highly competitive players, the best of whom might be recruited by Senior clubs.

The Enterprise were competitive enough to challenge Senior clubs, but often the challenges were not accepted. "We understand that the Enterprise club have challenged several of our leading clubs who have not responded as it was expected they would," according to the Brooklyn Daily Eagle. "Don’t be afraid of the boys[,] gentlemen, but come out boldly and play them even if there is a chance of your being defeated. Those who back out will certainly merit the white feather for an ornament."

There was an explosive growth of the game regionally and nationally in the late 1850s. In 1860, the National Association of Base Ball Players (NABBP), which served to legitimize, standardize, and popularize the game, admitted 21 new teams to its ranks, including the Enterprise. "Each new entry was required to pay a $5 admission fee and agree to pay annual dues of $5," wrote baseball historian William Ryczek. "Of the new clubs, 13 were from New York state, but the presence of eight from other states was encouraging." Upon admission to the NABBP, the Enterprise began the 1861 season officially recognized as a Senior club.

Quality of play

“Any one who witnessed the [May 28, 1858] game [between the Star Club of Brooklyn and the Enterprise Club of Brooklyn] will admit that of all Junior clubs, they rank highest," reported Porter's Spirit of the Times. "It was played by both sides as finely, and as many excellent points were made, as will be seen in almost any match of the Senior players. … We shall watch with much interest the future games of these clubs, and advise those who wish to witness much pretty play, to be present at whatever game they may participate in."

The Enterprise was considered an excellent source of talented young players, who were then recruited by more high-profile clubs. According to the New York Clipper, reporting in 1860, “The Enterprise and Star were the leading junior organizations up to 1859, when both entered the [NABBP]. Last season the Stars took a decided lead, being much stronger than the Enterprise; but this season, judging from the play of the respective clubs thus far, we are inclined to award the palm to the Enterprise club. … [The two clubs] have been rivals since their organization, the Enterprise club practicing on the same grounds as the Atlantics, and the Stars, up to this season, on that of the Excelsior Club, both the Atlantics and Excelsiors being at times recruited from these junior clubs."

After a close loss to the Senior class Brooklyn Atlantics in 1860, the Brooklyn Daily Eagle commended the Junior club, noting, "The Enterprise players have learned the value and importance of proper discipline in their nine, and for a young club they are remarkably well organized in this respect, and it is in this that they have an advantage over the Atlantic’s [sic], who this season has been lacking in this very necessary matter."

Home field

The concept of a one-team "home field" did not exist in the early days of the sport. Amateur era clubs had "home" playing grounds—such as parks, public recreation areas, or vacant lots—although they were often shared with other teams and other sports (particularly cricket).

According to the New York Clipper in May 1862, “The members of [the Atlantic Club] commenced play for the season [on May 12], the late date of their opening game resulting from their having their grounds newly laid out, which has been done under the superintendence of Mr. Wild. The ground is now one of the best of the city, and in a few weeks will be in fine condition. These grounds are occupied by the Atlantics on Mondays and Thursdays, and by the Enterprise club on Wednesdays and Saturdays." The Clipper added, "There are, therefore, two days each week unoccupied, and these days can be secured on application to Mr. Wild, at the Cline Hill Hotel, corner of Gates and Marcey Avenue.” (Sunday ball was prohibited by law.)

In the 1860s, fenced-in parks, such as the Union Grounds (1862) and the Capitoline Grounds (1864), began hosting competitive sports matches. From 1864 to 1866, the Enterprise shared Brooklyn's lavish, multi-purpose Capitoline Grounds as their home field. In May, 1865, the New York Times reported, "The Capitoline grounds ... are to be the locale of some of the most interesting and exciting games of the season. Three ball clubs — the Atlantic, Excelsior and Enterprise — and one cricket Club — the Long Island — occupying it this year. A new clubhouse has been erected, costing several thousand dollars, and ample preparations have been made for the accommodation of the fair sex. In fact it is to be the popular resort of the ball-playing fraternity and their fair guests of the Western District of Brooklyn."

That did not mean that all playing fields were conducive to serious ball-playing. The Brooklyn Daily Eagle, covering a game between the Enterprise and the Star Club in June 1865, described the Star Grounds, opposite Carroll Park, as a "vacant lot with cobble-stone paved streets on three sides, and the lot a stony and sterile waste, [which] forms what are here called ball grounds—and no man can be expected to make much headway with spikes, on pavement. But this is the best ground South Brooklyn affords, and of course players must make allowances for that."

Historical record

To date more than 85 games played by the Enterprise have been documented. Records were not kept for an unknown number of games; for others, records were lost, or research has yet to turn up specific details. Some games were documented in Charles Peverelly's Book of American Pastimes, which was self-published in 1866. Other Enterprise matches have been documented at Protoball.org, a clearinghouse of information about pre-professional baseball. Enterprise game chronicles have been located in the archives of such New York-based newspapers as The New York Clipper, The Brooklyn Eagle, Porter's Spirit of the Times, Wilkes Spirit of the Times, The New York Times, The New York Daily Herald, and others.

After the 1861 season, a number of key Enterprise regulars, including first baseman Joe Start and outfielders Jack Chapman and Fred Crane, left the team and joined the rival Brooklyn Atlantics. This caused a rift between the clubs. "[T]he Enterprise ... had shared a field with and been mentored by the Atlantics in the 1850s while the Enterprise was still a junior club," wrote historians Craig Waff and William Ryczek. "But the latter was now a senior club, and the Atlantics’ raid of three ... Enterprise players (in addition to Charley Smith in 1858) permanently soured the Atlantic-Enterprise relationship. The two clubs would not play against each other again."

Though the Enterprise played a busy schedule in 1861, many teams began to scale back games that year, a process that continued through 1863, as many young, able-bodied males were recruited to fight in the American Civil War. Only one 1862 game played by the Enterprise has been documented, and none for 1863.

Scoring totals in Enterprise matches, and in all contemporary games, were dramatically higher than in late 19th century thru today. Baseball historian Bruce Allardice said scoring in early games was "reminiscent of softball scores — which should not be surprising, since 1858–65 baseball resembled modern softball as much as it resembled modern baseball." MLB historian John Thorn noted that “baseball games of the 1860s typically featured 35 or more combined runs per game, with scores of 60-100 runs not unusual.” Runs scored per game in baseball matches decreased starting in the 1870s as a result of rules changes, craftier pitching, improved fielding, and changes in equipment.

No matches involving the Enterprise have been documented beyond 1866. In April 1867, the Brooklyn Daily Eagle, in a brief item about a former Enterprise player named Smith who would be playing for the National Club of Washington that year, referred to the Enterprise as "defunct." According to at least one authoritative historical chronicle, the Enterprise merged with the Excelsior Club in late 1866, and continuing under the name Excelsior fielded a competitive team in 1867.

Legacy

Several players on the Enterprise later went on to extended careers playing professionally in the National Association and the National League. One was historically pivotal in establishing how his field position would thereafter be played: first baseman Joe Start (although Start is listed in many news accounts as playing third base for the Enterprise). Start had a 27-year career of sustained excellence through 1886, playing professionally with the Atlantic for a decade, then playing 16 years in the Major Leagues.

The team name "Enterprise" became common, with similarly named (but unrelated) squads in Memphis (1866), Peoria (1867), Newark (1860), Jersey City (1859), Sidney (1866), Middleport (1868), Pittsburgh (1866), Allegheny (PA), Baltimore, Chicago, Troy (New York), and elsewhere. However, the Brooklyn team is the earliest known to adopt the name.

Significant Enterprise players
Newspaper coverage of amateur-era games generally mentioned only last names in stories, and players were similarly listed in box scores. Hence, the identities of most Enterprise players are unknown. The following players had established careers after leaving the Enterprise:
Jack "Death to Flying Things" Chapman
Fred Crane
Bob "Death to Flying Things" Ferguson
George Hall
William H. Murtha
Charley Smith
Joseph E. Sprague
Joe Start

Documented games

Sources

Freyer, John and Mark Rucker. Peverelly's National Game. Dover, New Hampshire: Arcadia Publishing: 2005.

References

National Association of Base Ball Players teams
Defunct baseball teams in New York City
Sports in Brooklyn
Baseball teams disestablished in 1866
Baseball teams established in 1856
Defunct baseball teams in New York (state)